Kokumbona (also Kakambona) is a village on the island of Guadalcanal in the Solomon Islands.

It was a Japanese base during World War II and the site of a United States Marine Corps amphibious landing on 19 August 1942.

Located on Guadalcanal's north coast, west of Honiara.

Populated places in Guadalcanal Province